Windsor was an electoral district of the Legislative Assembly in the Australian state of New South Wales, created in 1859 and named after the town of Windsor. It was abolished in 1880. The sitting member, Henry McQuade, unsuccessfully contested The Hawkesbury.

Members for Windsor

Election results

References

Former electoral districts of New South Wales
Constituencies established in 1859
1859 establishments in Australia
Constituencies disestablished in 1880
1880 disestablishments in Australia